Wonderview School District  is a public school district based in Conway County, Arkansas. It is located in an unincorporated area, and has a Hattieville postal address.

It includes the communities of Wonderview, Cleveland, Jerusalem, and Hattieville.

In 1974 the Conway County School District dissolved, with the Wonderview district receiving a portion of it.

Schools
Wonderview High School
Wonderview Elementary School

References

Further reading
 (Download) - Includes maps of predecessor districts

External links
 

School districts in Arkansas
Education in Conway County, Arkansas